Cornelis Wilhelmus van Hasselt (5 October 1872 – 16 January 1951) was a Dutch footballer and manager.

Playing career
Van Hasselt played for hometown club Sparta Rotterdam from 1893 to 1905. Van Hasselt played six times for an early Dutch representative side, playing friendlies against European club teams in the late 19th century.

Managerial career
In 1901, Van Hasselt began to organise friendly games against Belgium. As a result of the games not being sanctioned by the Royal Dutch Football Association (KNVB), only players from the second division were available to Van Hasselt. Belgium won the first four games 8–0, 1–0, 2–1 and 6–4. In 1904, the KNVB became a founding member of FIFA. On 30 April 1905, the Netherlands played their first official international game, beating Belgium 4–1 in Antwerp, Belgium. Van Hasselt would manage the Dutch national team for ten more games, winning five and losing five, before being replaced by former England international Edgar Chadwick.

References

Footballers from Rotterdam
1872 births
1951 deaths
Association football defenders
Dutch footballers
Netherlands national football team managers
Dutch football managers
Sparta Rotterdam players